Blitum bonus-henricus (syn. Chenopodium bonus-henricus), also called Good-King-Henry, poor-man's asparagus, perennial goosefoot, Lincolnshire spinach, Markery, English mercury, or mercury goosefoot, is a species of goosefoot which is native to much of central and southern Europe.

Good-King-Henry has been grown as a vegetable in cottage gardens for hundreds of years, although this dual-purpose vegetable is now rarely grown and the species is more often considered a weed.

Description
The seeds are reddish-green, 2–3 mm in diameter.

Taxonomy
The species was described in 1753 by Carl Linnaeus as Chenopodium bonus-henricus in Species Plantarum. Until 2012, the species was usually included in genus Chenopodium, but molecular genetical research revealed that it does not really belong to this genus. It seems to be more closely related to the genus Spinacia, and is now placed in the genus Blitum in  the tribe Anserineae. The scientific name Blitum bonus-henricus was first used by Ludwig Reichenbach in 1832.

Synonyms basing on the same type specimen are: Agathophytum bonus-henricus (L.) Moq., Anserina bonus-henricus (L.) Dumort., Atriplex bonus-henricus (L.) Crantz, Chenopodium bonus-henricus L., Orthospermum bonus-henricus (L.) Schur, and Orthosporum bonus-henricus (L.) T. Nees. Heterotypic synonyms are: Blitum perenne Bubani, Chenopodium hastatum St.-Lag., Chenopodium ruderale Kit. ex Moq., Chenopodium ruderale St.-Lag., Chenopodium sagittatum Lam., Chenopodium spinacifolium Stokes, Chenopodium triangulare Dulac, Chenopodium triangularifolia Gilib., and Orthosporum unctuosum Montandon.

Cultivation
Blitum bonus-henricus thrives best in a fertile, sunny location which is free from perennial weeds.  Cold-stratified seeds may have superior germination rates. Very little growth is produced in the first season. This plant does not respond well to transplantation. The foliage may be cut back in autumn.

Uses 
Cropping can begin in spring. Some of the new shoots can be thinned out as they appear (usually from mid-spring to early summer) and cooked like asparagus. All cutting should then cease so that shoots are allowed to develop. The succulent triangular leaves may be harvested a few at a time until the end of August and cooked like spinach.

Gallery

References

External links

bonus-henricus
Flora of Europe
Leaf vegetables
Perennial vegetables
Stem vegetables
Flora of New Jersey
Plants described in 1753
Taxa named by Carl Linnaeus
Flora without expected TNC conservation status